A Waltz by Strauss (German: Ein Walzer von Strauß) is a 1925 Austrian silent film directed by Max Neufeld and starring Eugen Neufeld, Tessy Harrison, and Svet Petrovich.

The film's sets were designed by the art director Julius von Borsody.

Cast
Eugen Neufeld as Bankpräsident Mario Velloni  
Tessy Harrison as Elisabeth Velloni  
Svet Petrovich as Rittmeister Baron 
Max Sterenyi as Lengsfelder  
Fred Louis Lerch as Dr. Poldi Mahler  
Charlotte Ander as Lintschi Ebeseder  
Robert Valberg as Nicolaus Baransky  
Hans Ziegler as Prokurist Leiser  
Max Nekut as President of the Foreign Bank Association  
Armin Seydelmann as President of the Paris Bank Trust  
Hans Melzer as Colonel of the Reichswehr  
Anton Amon as Velloni's valet
Ferdinand Mayerhofer as Master of the Club  
Otto Schmöle as man in a tailcoat
Strauß Johann as Nephew  
Anita Berber as dancer  
Philipp von Zeska as Franz Schubert  
Bella Siris as dancer 
Georg Kundert

References

External links

Films directed by Max Neufeld
Austrian silent feature films
Films set in Vienna
Cultural depictions of Johann Strauss I
Cultural depictions of Johann Strauss II
Cultural depictions of Franz Schubert
Austrian black-and-white films